Dream Dad is a 2014 Philippine comedy-drama television series directed by Jeffrey R. Jeturian, starring Jana Agoncillo and Zanjoe Marudo. The series premiered on ABS-CBN's Primetime Bida evening block and worldwide on The Filipino Channel from November 24, 2014 to April 17, 2015, replacing Hawak Kamay and was replaced by Nathaniel.

Plot
The story centers on Sebastian "Baste" Javier (Zanjoe Marudo), a kind-hearted veterinarian from Batangas, who chose to succeed his father Eliseo (Ariel Ureta) as the president of ENS Dairy Corporation, in order to preserve his parents' strained relationship.

With the help of his trusted friend, Michael (Ketchup Eusebio), and his devoted executive assistant, Alex (Beauty Gonzalez), Baste transforms himself from a boardroom neophyte into a learned businessman. But it was a decision that came with a painful cost - Angel (Neri Naig), his one great love.

Left with a broken heart, Baste meets Baby (Jana Cassandra Agoncillo) - a wide-eyed orphan girl who believes that he is her long-lost father. 
The two are forced to work together when Baby suddenly bags the much coveted role of becoming the new face of Wink Milk, the flagship product of Baste's company.

As they spend more time with each other, Baby begins to see through Baste's pain and, in him, the father she longed for all her life. Even with the knowledge that Baste is indeed not her biological father, Baby chooses to help him piece his heart back together. And in the process, Baste learns to trust and gambles on love once again. Eventually, Baste and his assistant Alex fell in love with each other and even planned for a wedding.

Consequently, the two bond in an unlikely love story between a bachelor relearning to love the simple joys in life and a young kid whose spirit does not know how to stop loving. In the series, Baste was able to get custody as an adoptive parent of Baby. This happened despite the presence of Baby's biological mother, Bebeth (Yen Santos).

In the end, Baste realizes that behind every great man, and every great father – may it be by blood, or otherwise – is a family that never fails to support him despite all his shortcomings.

Cast and characters

Main cast
 Zanjoe Marudo as President Sebastian "Baste" V. Javier
 Jana Agoncillo as Baby Javier
 Beauty Gonzalez as Alexandra "Alex" Sta. Maria-Javier

Supporting cast
 Maxene Magalona as April Mae Pamintuan 
 Gloria Diaz as Nenita Viray-Javier
 Ariel Ureta as Eliseo Javier
 Ketchup Eusebio as Michael Castro
 Katya Santos as Precious San Juan-Castro
 Yen Santos as Maribeth "Bebeth" Morales
 Matt Evans as Paul Monteliano
 Ces Quesada as Carmen Castro
 Dante Ponce as Julio Pamintuan
 Atoy Co as Miguel Castro
 Jonicka Cyleen Movido as Rain
 John Steven de Guzman as Tikboy
 Viveika Ravanes as Corina "Coring" Isidro
 Ces Aldaba as Mang David
 Ana Feleo as Aleli Panganiban
 Rez Cortez as Enrique Sta. Maria
 Bryan Termulo as Kenneth Sta. Maria
 Teejay Marquez as Jake Sta. Maria
 Paulo Angeles as Manuel Castro
 Joma Labayen as Amado
 Guji Lorenzana as Francis
 Pamu Pamorada as Lilet

Guest cast
 Neri Naig as Angel San Jose
 Raikko Mateo as young Sebastian "Baste" Javier
 Carlo Aquino as young Eliseo Javier
 Anna Luna as young Nenita Viray-Javier
 Sue Ramirez as young Carmen Castro
 Paul Jake Castillo as young Miguel Castro
 Kiray Celis as Gracia Anna (TV character)
 Michelle Vito as Señorita Glenda (TV character)
 Christopher Roxas
 Via Veloso
 Jacob Benedicto as Jaymart
 Arlene Muhlach as Stella
 Mikee Villanueva as Javier family's attorney

Production
The initial premiere of Dream Dad was originally On November 17, 2014 at 5:45pm, replacing Pure Love. However, due to its popularity, last minute decision and unexpectedly selection of Bagito — the known network's teen drama series — as a later's replacement, the air date was later moved to November 24, 2014 at 7:45pm, replacing Hawak Kamay.

Trivia 
 This is the first project of Magalona in her comeback. Also this is the very first teleserye of Teejay Marquez here on ABS-CBN.
 The Philippine morning television talk show broadcast, Magandang Buhay title is inspired by a popular tagline in Dream Dad, "Magandang Buhay".

Reception

Awards
2015 11th USTV Awards: Year's choice of drama program

See also
List of programs broadcast by ABS-CBN
List of telenovelas of ABS-CBN

References

External links
 

ABS-CBN drama series
Philippine comedy television series
2014 Philippine television series debuts
2015 Philippine television series endings
Filipino-language television shows
Television shows set in Manila